Rang-du-Fliers (also Rang-du-Fliers-Verton and Rang-du-Fliers-Verton-Berck) is a railway station serving the towns Rang-du-Fliers, Verton and Berck, all in the Pas-de-Calais department, northern France.

Services
The station is served by TER Hauts-de-France services between Boulogne-sur-Mer and Amiens. It also sees a TGV service to Paris Gare du Nord via Calais-Fréthun. It was formerly a station on the CF du ARB, which closed in 1955.

References

Railway stations in Pas-de-Calais